Freimann is a railway station in the German city of Munich. It is part of the Munich U-Bahn network and lies on the U6 line in the borough of Schwabing-Freimann.

Notable places nearby
Zenith

References

External links

Munich U-Bahn stations
Railway stations in Germany opened in 1971
1971 establishments in West Germany